Buzzards Bay Entrance Light is a lighthouse located in open water at the entrance to Buzzards Bay, about four nautical miles west southwest of Cuttyhunk Island, Massachusetts. The light has a racon showing the letter "B".

In 1996 the present structure replaced a Texas Tower built in 1961, which in turn had replaced the lightships Hens & Chickens (LV-5) and Vineyard Sound (LV-10). Since it sits in water 50 ft (15m) deep, a conventional lighthouse would have been difficult, forcing the choice of structure.

References

Lighthouses completed in 1997
Lighthouses completed in 1961
Lighthouses in Barnstable County, Massachusetts
1961 establishments in Massachusetts